Nesoryzomys swarthi, also known as the Santiago nesoryzomys or Santiago Galápagos mouse, is a species of rodent in the genus Nesoryzomys of family Cricetidae. It is found only on Santiago in the Galápagos Islands.  Its natural habitat is subtropical or tropical dry shrubland.

It was considered extinct since it was last recorded in 1906, but it was rediscovered in 1997. A smaller, related rice rat was also rediscovered—the Fernandina rice rat (Nesoryzomys fernandinae) on Fernandina.

References

Literature cited
Musser, G.G. and Carleton, M.D. 2005. Superfamily Muroidea. Pp. 894–1531 in Wilson, D.E. and Reeder, D.M. (eds.). Mammal Species of the World: a taxonomic and geographic reference. 3rd ed. Baltimore: The Johns Hopkins University Press, 2 vols., 2142 pp. 
Tirira, D., Dowler, R., Boada, C. and Weksler, M. 2008. . In IUCN. IUCN Red List of Threatened Species. Version 2009.2. <www.iucnredlist.org>. Downloaded on November 29, 2009.

Endemic fauna of the Galápagos Islands
Nesoryzomys
Mammals described in 1938
Taxonomy articles created by Polbot